Destroy All Humans! 2: Reprobed is an open world action-adventure video game developed by Black Forest Games and published by THQ Nordic. It is the sixth installment in the Destroy All Humans! franchise, and a remake of the 2006 original game. 

In Destroy All Humans! 2: Reprobed, players assume the role of Crypto, as he travels to various locations around the world, including England, Russia, and the United States, in order to complete various missions and defeat human enemies. The game features a variety of weapons and abilities that players can use to defeat enemies, including the ability to mind control humans and use powerful alien technology.

Plot 
Set in the 1960's, the game takes place ten years after the events of the first game. This time, Crypto is back to exact revenge on the KGB for blowing up the Furon mothership.

Gameplay 

Destroy All Humans! 2: Reprobed is played from a third-person perspective. It is an action-adventure game that involves both shooting and stealth elements. As players progress throughout the game, new weapons, new abilities, better stats, and access to new vehicles are unlocked. The game is set across five locations: Bay City, Albion, Takoshima, Tunguska, and the Solaris moon base (some of which are parodies of real-life locations such as San Francisco, London, and Tokyo). Several of these locations have been expanded in size from the original game, adding new areas to explore.

The game's campaign is fully playable in both single-player and two-player local split-screen co-op.

Release 
Destroy All Humans! 2: Reprobed was released on PlayStation 5, Windows, and Xbox Series X/S on August 30, 2022. The game launched with a physical collector's edition, entitled the Second Coming Edition, limited to 3,700 copies.

Reception 

Destroy All Humans! 2: Reprobed received "mixed or average" reviews according to review aggregator Metacritic.

IGN gave the game 6/10, writing that "Destroy All Humans! 2: Reprobed does a fine job of updating the 2006 original to look like a modern game, but that game was a fairly unambitious sequel that didn’t do much to evolve its gameplay...by and large it’s more of the same B-movie sci-fi homage without a lot of brain-popping new ideas."

Notes

References

External links 
 
 Destroy All Humans! 2: Reprobed at MobyGames

2022 video games
Action-adventure games
Alien invasions in video games
Black Forest games
Video games about cloning
Destroy All Humans
Holography in fiction
Open-world video games
Nintendo Switch games
PlayStation 5 games
Science fiction video games
THQ Nordic games
Video games about extraterrestrial life
Video games developed in Germany
Video game remakes
Video games set in 1969
Video games set in London
Video games set in Russia
Video games set in San Francisco
Video games set in the Soviet Union
Video games set in Tokyo
Video games set on the Moon
Xbox Series X and Series S games
Windows games
Unreal Engine games
Multiplayer and single-player video games
Cooperative video games